Angelo is a 2017 Chinese television series starring Cecilia Liu and Ming Dao. It is a remake of the South Korean drama Thank You written by Lee Kyung-hee. Filming took place from October 10, 2011 to January 15, 2012. After five years, Hunan TV announced that it will be airing the series via its online platform Mango TV on 22 May 2017 every Monday and Tuesday at 18:00 (CST).

Synopsis
An Jieluo is an outstanding doctor whose wealthy background and talent causes him to be arrogant and curt. But due to his family problems and his failure to save his terminally-ill girlfriend, he begins to give up on life. He is haunted by her confession that she had unwittingly infected a young girl with HIV via a contaminated blood transfusion when she was a medical intern years ago and never owned up to her mistake. Grieving and needing to make amends on her behalf, Jieluo searches for the child Liping and finds her on Pehu Island. He meets the child, who is living happily with her mother Li Xiaohan, innocently unaware of her condition. Li Xiaohan possesses extraordinary beauty, but her poor family background and lack of education makes her feel inferior. Still, Xiaohan works hard in hope of a better life for her and Liping. Jieluo was tasked by his mother to help her in renovating the island, and thus lived in Xiaohan's lodge. While executing the project, Jieluo runs into a problem when he tried to carry out the acquisition of a land property, but it was solved with the help of Xiaohan. Despite their contrasting personalities, Jieluo and Xiaohan began to develop an understanding of each other while working together, and they slowly fell in love and becomes a father figure to Xiaohan's daughter. However, their mother was against them being together and wanted Xiaohan to leave Jieluo in exchange for the continuation of the island's renovation project. For the benefit of everyone living on the island, Xiaohan decides to disappear. This dealt a great blow to Jieluo, and finding Xiaohan became his only goal. However, just when they were about to reunite, a fatal car accident forces their life to be in peril.

Cast

Main
Cecilia Liu as Li Xiaohan
A strong and determined single mother.  
Ming Dao as An Jieluo
An outstanding doctor with an exemplary family background, who is curt and arrogant. 
Jeremy Tsui as Jiang Fengen
Li Xiaohan's ex-boyfriend and Liping's father.
Jessie Chiang as Xu Yiyun
A wealthy girl who is in love with Jiang Fengen. 
Tang Zhen as Li Liping
Li Xiaohan's daughter. An optimistic and cheerful child who only wishes for her mother to be happy. She is an HIV patient.

Supporting 
Hong Zilin as Xiao Xi
Anthony Xie as A Xu, Xiaohan's younger brother
Tian Miao as An Jieluo's mother
Ge Lei as Jiang Fengen's mother
Wang Mengli as Wei Wei
Liu Jin as Village Chief
Xiao Xingfei as Meng De
An Long as A Sheng
Xu Yuan as Jun Jun

Special appearance
Lv Jiarong as Yan Youfeng, Jieluo's ex-girlfriend

Soundtrack

References

External links

Chinese romance television series
Chinese television series based on South Korean television series
Hunan Television dramas
2017 Chinese television series debuts
Television series by H&R Century Pictures
HIV/AIDS in television
Television shows set in Zhejiang